Minersville is a ghost town in Trinity County, California. The town was flooded by the creation of Trinity Lake.

See also
List of ghost towns in California

References

Former populated places in Trinity County, California
Ghost towns in California